Harmon Peleg Burroughs (May 19, 1846 – January 31, 1907) was an American farmer and politician.

Burroughs was born near Rochester, New York and went to the local public schools. He served in the 8th New York Cavalry Regiment during the American Civil War and was wounded while in battle. He was commissioned a major. After the war, he moved to Virginia and then settled in Elkville, Illinois. He was a farmer. Burroughs served in the Illinois House of Representatives in 1895 and 1896 and was a Democrat. He died at his farm after being kicked in the head by a colt in the barn.

Notes

There is absolutely no connection of Burroughs and Harmon name.

External links

1846 births
1907 deaths
Politicians from Rochester, New York
People from Jackson County, Illinois
People of New York (state) in the American Civil War
Farmers from Illinois
Democratic Party members of the Illinois House of Representatives
Accidental deaths in Illinois
Union Army officers
19th-century American politicians
Military personnel from Illinois